Letters to Judy: What Kids Wish They Could Tell You is a book published by Judy Blume in 1986. It is not a novel, but a collection of letters from children with responses from Blume.

Blume quotes correspondence she receives asking for advice, written by readers of her children's books, boys and girls who feel unable to confide in their parents. The letters come from children, ranging from 10 years old through the teens, who write about specific problems most of which Blume has addressed in her novels. Some of these kids are rejected by peers; others feel neglected at home or hurt by divorce. A divorced mother herself, Blume is sympathetic to the young people who write to her and sympathizes with parents as well; she intends this book to help them become more aware of their children's needs.

1986 children's books
Children's non-fiction books
Books by Judy Blume
Collections of letters
American children's books